Zugara is an American corporation headquartered in Los Angeles, California, United States that develops and licenses augmented reality software and creates Natural User Interface experiences for brands.

Zugara was founded in March 2001 as an interactive marketing company with a focus on interactive strategy and web application development. From 2001 to 2008, the company created award-winning interactive campaigns for Fortune 500 brands including Sony PlayStation, Activision Blizzard, Reebok, Toyota, Lexus, Casio and the U.S. Air Force. In early 2009, Zugara shifted focus to augmented reality software development and began development on augmented reality technologies and SDK's. Later that year, the company launched an early prototype of the Webcam Social Shopper augmented reality ecommerce product.

On September 25, 2012, Zugara was granted US Patent No. 8,275,590 for "Providing a simulation of wearing items such as garments and/or accessories". The patent covers Zugara's augmented reality technology that powers Virtual dressing rooms.

History

2001–2006: Interactive Strategy
Zugara's early efforts included award-winning interactive campaigns such as 'RBK Whodunit?' that featured integration of digital efforts with television, out of home and other advertising channels. Zugara cited the RBK Whodunit campaign's ability to drive 33% of site visitors to a retail location to interact with the product as the primary success of the campaign.
The following years saw Zugara continue to focus on interactive video initiatives with another award-winning campaign with GSD&M and the U.S. Air Force, called Do Something Amazing. The campaign and interactive component featured interactive video of the F-22 Raptor and other U.S. Air Force vehicles. The campaign was featured as a Pick of The Week by Ad Age's Creativity magazine.

Zugara's other notable work included interactive marketing campaigns for Sony PlayStation properties including The Getaway, God of War, Gran Turismo 4 and the PSP.

2007–2008: User Interface and User Experience
In 2007, Zugara's focus turned to User Interface and User Experience design for clients including Toyota and Lexus. Initial notable work with User Interface design included concepting a new method for building your Lexus online. Zugara also applied its User Interface expertise for touchscreen kiosk initiatives for the U.S. Air Force.

2009–present: Augmented Reality Software Development

In June 2009, Zugara launched The Webcam Social Shopper augmented reality ecommerce prototype. Cited initially as an "Augmented Reality Dressing Room", The Webcam Social Shopper allows online shoppers to use a webcam to visualize virtual garments on themselves while shopping online. The software also uses a motion capture system that allows users to use hand motions to navigate the software while standing away from their computer. Social media integration with Facebook and Twitter also allows users of the software to send pictures of themselves with the virtual garments for immediate feedback.

Though the Webcam Social Shopper has also been called virtual fitting room or virtual dressing room software, Zugara has referred to the software as an advanced product visualization tool for retailers.

Later in 2009, Zugara was ranked by VentureBeat as one of the top augmented reality startups.

Shortly thereafter, Zugara officially announced that it was focusing on augmented reality software development exclusively. Zugara's technologies were soon being utilized by AT&T for a World Cup augmented reality Soccer engagement and by Orange Silicon Valley for an augmented reality telemedicine prototype.

Products

Webcam Social Shopper
The Webcam Social Shopper is Zugara's flagship product. The company developed the product when it noticed that online shopping conversion rates were stuck between 2% to 3%. Though online shopping was optimized for searching and browsing, it was not optimized for an engaging experience like in-store retail experiences at a mall. With the software turning an online shopper's webcam into a mirror, it was creating the offline 'at the rack' moment for shoppers at home. This helped shoppers make a more informed purchase decision by seeing an item on themselves through their webcam.

In November 2009, the Webcam Social Shopper was first deployed as Fashionista by online fashion site, Tobi.com. This initial version of the Webcam Social Shopper, used an augmented reality marker for placement of the virtual garment on the subject.

In February 2011, a new version of the Webcam Social Shopper was debuted publicly for the first time at the DEMO conference in Palm Springs, California and won the DEMOgod award. This latest version of the software removed the need for a marker and instead used facial tracking for placement of the virtual garment. Dubbed the "Plug and Play" version of the Webcam Social Shopper, this version of the software was designed for easier integration for retailers and ecommerce sites.

In June 2011, UK Fashion Retailer, Banana Flame, was the first retailer to integrate the Plug and Play version of the virtual dressing room software. According to Matthew Szymczyk, CEO of Zugara, the new version of the Webcam Social Shopper can be integrated by a retailer in less than a day. Banana Flame deployed the software to offer a virtual dressing room for online shoppers to "try on" the clothes virtually on Banana Flame's website.

On July 10, 2012, Zugara released an API for the Webcam Social Shopper for ecommerce platform integration. PrestaShop was the first ecommerce platform to offer the new Webcam Social Shopper module to its 127,000 retailers. In less than a week, over 140 retailers had downloaded the module.

On October 3, 2013, Zugara released a Kinect enabled version of its Webcam Social Shopper software called, "WSS For Kiosks". On December 10, 2013, PayPal debuted a mobile payments enhanced version of WSS For Kiosks at the LeWeb conference in Paris.

Virtual Style Sense
On January 13, 2014, Zugara announced a new technology for in-store retailers called "Virtual Style Sense". In partnership with Samsung, this Virtual dressing room technology for in-store retailers debuted at the National Retail Conference's Big Show in New York.

Critical Acclaim
TIME magazine cited the Webcam Social Shopper as one of the few useful augmented reality applications that could be advantageous to both retailers and consumers.
Fast Company called the Webcam Social Shopper 'the future'.

Online Retail results
 Internet Retailer published a report on Virtual Fitting Rooms and Fit Simulators on February 1, 2012. Danish social shopping comparison site LazyLazy.com deployed the Webcam Social Shopper in late 2011 and saw its conversion rate immediately jump with 17% of shoppers using the software converting 2 to 3 times more than those who did not use the software.
 In February 2012, the Mattel brand, Barbie, used a kiosk-enabled version of the Webcam Social Shopper for a New York Fashion Week event where attendees could try on virtual Barbie outfits. Data released by Zugara, showed that the web version of the Barbie Dream Closet software showed increased usage over a 3-month period. From February 2012 to April 2012 use of the software increased from 20% to 33% and 50% of those users took an average of 6 photos each.

Technologies
Zugara's augmented reality and computer vision technologies are used together for the company's Webcam Social Shopper product. However, Zugara has also used these individual technologies for brand applications and prototype development.

ZugMO Motion Capture
ZugMO motion capture technology allows online users to interact with their webcam based on gestural motions. ZugMO technology has been used by brands including Nestle, Toyota, Olay and Purina.

ZugMUG Facial Tracking
ZugMUG is a facial tracking technology that allows the webcam to track the users face through the webcam interface. For the Webcam Social Shopper product, this allows a virtual garment to track to an individual's face for better placement of the virtual item. The technology has also been used in a Virtual Exam application for Anthem that allowed virtual medical instruments to track to a person's eyes, ears and mouth.

ZugSTAR Interactive Video Chat
ZugSTAR technology is short for Zugara Streaming Augmented Reality. This technology allows multiple participants to share an augmented reality experience in an interactive video chat interface. Zugara debuted a ZugSTAR prototype integrated with The Webcam Social Shopper at the IAB Poland conference in Warsaw and again at the NRF Big Show in New York City in 2010.

Though many people have doubted the utility of initial augmented reality technology, ReadWriteWeb cited ZugSTAR as "one of the most clearly way more useful."

Industry criticism
Zugara has been an outspoken critic of conceptual augmented reality, citing that augmented reality companies have not been focused on monetizing the technology.

Press
AdAge selected Zugara for AdAge's Creativity 50 in 2010.

References

External links
Augmented Reality In Education
The Year Of Augmented Reality
The Augmented Reality Industry's Jan Brady Complex

Augmented reality
Software companies of the United States
Software companies established in 2001
2001 establishments in California